Bikshandarkoil, or Pichandarkovil, is a census town in  Tiruchirappalli District of Tamil Nadu, India. It forms a part of the Tiruchirappalli urban agglomeration.

Notes 

Neighbourhoods and suburbs of Tiruchirappalli